Phnom Chhnork is a Hindu cave temple in Kampot Province, southern Cambodia, located about  north-east of Kampot. The temple was built in the 7th century from Funan brick, dedicated to Shiva.  It is accessed via stone steps.

References

External links 

7th-century religious buildings and structures
Caves of Cambodia
Hindu temples in Cambodia
Buildings and structures in Kampot province
Geography of Kampot province